Nanok East Greenland Fishing Company (1929–1990), generally known as Nanok, was a Danish company in Greenland, mainly active in the hunting and trading of arctic foxes for their fur.

A cultural organization with the objective of propagating knowledge about Northeast Greenland was founded in 1992 under the same name.

History 
Nanok was founded in 1929 by Johannes Gerhardt Jennov (1886–1980) with the aim to exploit natural resources in remote Northeast Greenland. It replaced the East Greenland Company (A/S Østgrønlandsk Kompagni) that had been founded in 1919. 
Right after its foundation in 1929 Nanok took over the Danish hunting stations that had been established by the former company.
Nanok also built a number of additional hunting huts in the uninhabited expanses of NE Greenland and cooperated with Sirius Dog Sled Patrol, the other organization active in the desolate area. Although the initial emphasis was laid on fisheries, in practice the company became mostly active in the hunting and trade of arctic foxes for there was a big demand for their valuable fur at the time.

Nanok's assistance and expertise in the area proved very helpful for the scientific expeditions that visited NE Greenland in mid-20th century.
The company lost significant revenues in 1952 when it ceased its lucrative fur trade operations. In the same year the Danish state withdrew its subsidies, after which the ailing company found it increasingly difficult to service the debts to its creditors and practically all but ceased operations. Jennov remained as Nanok's director from 1929 until 1976. Finally in 1990 the company became formally insolvent and was wrapped up.

Nanok Island (Nanok Ø), an island at the SW end of Dove Bay off the northern shores of Adolf S. Jensen Land was named after this company in the 1940s to commemorate its activity in the area.

, a Danish supply and cargo ship, equipped for operating in Arctic conditions, was named after the company as well. There was also a US Coast Guard ship named  (WYP-169) —a former fishing trawler of Boston, Massachusetts— serving in Greenland during World War II that was probably not named after the company, but after the polar bear.

See also
Cartographic expeditions to Greenland
Erik the Red's Land
Mørkefjord Expedition

Notes

References

External links
NANOK - Xsirius
Eske Brun: Østgrønlands-overenskomsten, Tidsskriftet Grønland. 1966, Nr. 4; pp. 127-136)

Hunting in Greenland
Hunting organizations
Defunct companies of Greenland
Food and drink companies established in 1929
Companies disestablished in 1990
History of Greenland